A spike maul is a type of hand tool used to drive railroad spikes in railroad track work.  It is also known as a spiking hammer.

Description
They have elongated double faced hardened steel heads.

Some spike mauls have symmetrical heads, but most have a slightly longer thinner side and a shorter larger diameter side of equal weight. The long side allows a user to spike over abnormally tall rails, and to drive spikes down next to highway crossing planks. The shorter side provides more surface area which requires less accuracy for normal spiking.

There are two typical patterns of spike mauls:
 Bell: This is the more common variety. Bell spike mauls are mostly cylindrical in shape.
 Standard: These have a square cross section, and a squared tapered end opposite the normal driving face.

Handles are often ash or hickory, but lesser species of woods find their way into economy handles. Some mauls come with fiberglass handles as well. Specialized mauls exist with nonconductive handles for work on electrified track.

Almost all spike mauls take a standard  oval eye sledge hammer handle, which is frequently replaced through the course of heavy use. This makes the maul more convenient when used only to "set" spikes for a powered spiker. It also makes the "windmill" spiking technique more comfortable. Windmilling is when a user takes the maul handle with both hands locked and strikes the spike with repeated fast blows by swinging in a circular motion over the shoulder. The standard "wood chopping" motion is more comfortable and natural for most people.

Use
Regardless of the technique employed it is important to strike railroad spikes with the handle of the maul as close to horizontal as possible. This requires the user to bend over at the waist with every swing. If the user attempts to drive spikes while standing erect the spike will often bend and the maul head will begin to sit crooked on the handle. Shortly thereafter the maul handle will break.

Because there are usually five (but sometimes six to eight) spikes driven per plate, and two plates applied per tie for each rail and because ties are placed so close together (usually, with ties on 16" centers)—thousands of spikes must be driven for each mile of track.  When this was done manually, before the advent of pneumatic spiking machines, it was important that spikes be driven in rapidly.  The standard, for a powerful and experienced spiker, was to drive the spike in with only three blows.  It required great strength, and considerable stamina, to maintain that pace.

Spike mauls are hardened tools. Occasionally the head may become upset or chipped. Heads are often reground on a bench grinder to remove nicks and metal flow. This practice is becoming less common as grinding can hide cracks and other defects. It is also possible to overheat the steel while grinding and remove some of the temper from the tool.

Brands
Brands of spike mauls include Slug-Devil, Tamco and Warwood.

References 
 Tartman, E.E. Russel, Railway Track and Track Work, McGraw-Hill 1909
 Camp, Walter Mason, Notes on Track, Self Published 1904

Further reading 

Hand tools
Hammers
Rail fastening systems
Maintenance of way equipment